Sheikh Showkat Hussain; born on 5 February 1954 is a Kashmiri political analyst and a prominent scholar of human rights and international law, he has authored several books on the Kashmir conflict.

Biography

Early life and education
Sheikh Showkat completed his bachelor of law degree in 1978 from Aligarh Muslim University, India. He proceeded for higher studies and completed his masters in law. He was awarded PhD for his thesis "The Status of Non-Muslims in Islamic state" in 1990. The thesis was published in form of a book, titled, "Minorities, Islam and Nation state" in Malaysia. 
Right from his student days he has been actively observing and participating in political movements. Even when he was a graduate student he participated in an election campaign against Sheikh Muhammad Abdullah in Ganderbal constituency once the later compromised his stand on self-determination of Kashmir for coming to power.
 
After his graduation he proceeded to Aligarh where he remained a proactive student. When he joined Aligarh Muslim University the University was in a severe crisis because government of India through an enactment of 1972 had deprived the University of its Muslim Character and was in process of erasing its cultural ethos. He valiantly fought against this campaign and was suspended from the University for opposing the cultural proselytisation of his alma mater. His activism transcended beyond the University in the form of his activities for the restoration of minority character of Aligarh Muslim University, preservation of Muslim personal law and restoration of Babri Masjid to Muslims. In this context he again remained in forefront of the campaign against the election of former Indian Prime Minister Rajiv Gandhi in his constituency Ameti while the later was challenged by Raj Mohan Gandhi, the grandson of Mahatma Gandhi.

Academic career
Right from his student days along with being an activist he has also been a researcher on student activism. On this subject he conducted a survey of various students groups within India.
Sheikh Showkat has specialised expertise in Human Rights, minority rights and Humanitarian Law, he developed a comparative perspective on Islam and modern notions of human rights. His work in this regard was published in India (Islam and Human Rights) and Malaysia (Islam and Human rights). The work on human rights received appreciation far and wide, Muslim World League journal, Mecca also published its portions in its journal. He worked actively in dissemination of humanitarian law in collaboration with International Committee of Red Cross; the purpose was to sensitise non-state actors about limits on means and methods of warfare, to deliver upon the purpose he coordinated 27 seminars across conflict ridden Kashmir. He was seminal in starting a post-graduate diploma in human rights at the University of Kashmir, the course was later suspended.

Teaching career
He was appointed as research associate, Institute of Objective Studies New Delhi (1987–1990) and later moved to Malaysia as assistant professor, International Islamic University Malaysia (1990–1995). While he was in Malaysia, Kashmir was experiencing extreme phase of insurgency against the Indian rule. He had a feeling that though there was a lot of activity against subjugation the resistance of Kashmir has not been articulated in a systematic way. This led him to leave Malaysia and come back to Kashmir where he tried to provide content to resistance through his writings in local dailies.  In 2000 he joined Department of Law, University of Kashmir. His academic pursuits didn't impede his contribution to Kashmir resistance in the form of his writings and oration. It was this activism on his part that landed him among those who were charged with sedition. Sheikh Showkat was charged for sedition in Delhi along with several other prominent figure such as the Kashmiri leader Syed Ali Shah Geelani, writer activist Arundhati Roy, Prof. S.A.R Geelani, Sujato Bhadra, Varavara Rao and Shuddhabrata Sengupta, for making a speech at a convention titled "Azadi: The Only Way”. This action of the Indian state was condemned worldwide.

Current engagement
Having served as the Head & Dean at the School of Legal Studies, Central University of Kashmir, Dr Sheikh also served as the Principal at the Kashmir Law College, University of Kashmir and taught international law and human rights.

Bibliography

References

1954 births
Living people
Indian political writers
Kashmiri writers
Aligarh Muslim University alumni
20th-century Indian lawyers
Indian legal writers
Academic staff of the International Islamic University Malaysia
Academic staff of the University of Kashmir
People from Srinagar